Giannis Dalakouras (born 7 February 1963) is a Greek football manager.

References

1963 births
Living people
Greek football managers
Panetolikos F.C. managers
Anagennisi Arta F.C. managers
Paniliakos F.C. managers
Sportspeople from Arta, Greece